Sterling Jerins is an American actress known for playing Lily Bowers on the NBC series Deception, Constance Lane in World War Z, Judy Warren in The Conjuring, The Conjuring 2 and The Conjuring: The Devil Made Me Do It, and Lila DuFresne on HBO's comedy series Divorce.

Career
In 2012, Jerins was added to the cast of the zombie apocalypse film World War Z, directed by Marc Forster, to play the role of Constance Lane, the younger daughter of Gerry (Brad Pitt) and Karen Lane (Mireille Enos). The film was released on June 21, 2013. She then appeared in The Conjuring, a supernatural horror film directed by James Wan, which was released on July 19, 2013. Jerins played Judy Warren, the daughter of Ed and Lorraine Warren (Patrick Wilson and Vera Farmiga).

Jerins co-starred in the romantic comedy And So It Goes, directed by Rob Reiner, playing the supporting role of Michael Douglas' character's granddaughter. In 2015, Jerins co-starred in the mystery thriller Dark Places, based on the novel of same name written by Gillian Flynn. Jerins played a young version of Charlize Theron's lead character Libby Day. Also that same year, she co-starred with Owen Wilson and Lake Bell in the action thriller film No Escape.

In 2016, she reprised her role as Judy Warren in the supernatural horror film sequel The Conjuring 2. She also co-starred in the HBO comedy series Divorce, with Sarah Jessica Parker and Thomas Haden Church.

Personal life
Jerins's elder sister, Ruby Jerins, is also an actress.

Filmography

Film

Television

References

External links
 

Living people
21st-century American actresses
American child actresses
American film actresses
American television actresses
Year of birth missing (living people)